Solanum arundo is a plant species with distribution in Eastern Africa and India.

Description 
It is a prickly shrub that stands from 2-6 meters tall, with purple flowers. It produces yellow fruit.

References 

arundo
Flora of Africa
Flora of India (region)